Gardens in Northern Ireland is a page for any garden open to the public in Northern Ireland.

List of gardens in Northern Ireland:
Belfast Botanic Gardens
Clandeboye Estate, Bangor, County Down
Drenagh, Limavady, County Londonderry
Mount Stewart, Newtownards, County Down
Rowallane Garden, Saintfield, County Down

See also
Register of Parks, Gardens and Demesnes of Special Historic Interest
Historic houses in Northern Ireland
List of gardens
Gardens in England
Gardens in Wales
Gardens in Scotland
Gardens in the Republic of Ireland

 
Gardens